Leonard Mullins (1918 – 19 September 1997) was a scientist and long-time Research Director at the former Malaysian Rubber Producers' Research Association.  He is known for his work on the stress-softening behavior of rubber, a phenomenon now known widely as the Mullins effect.

Personal 

Mullins was born on 21 May 1918 and died on 19 September 1997 at the age of 79.

Leonard was the eldest of 7 children, with his brothers Eric, Kenneth, John, known as Alan, and sisters Sylvia, Muriel and Eugenie.

He married Freda Churchouse on 6 March 1943 and had 2 daughters Margaret and Janet.

Education 

Mullins graduated from University College London in 1939
BSC (Hons), PhD, DSc

Career 

He had originally hoped to enter academia, but World War II interrupted his plans and he ended up working in weapons research for the British government.

In 1949, he oversaw the dismantling of the Bayer A.G. rubber labs and pilot plant at Leverkusen, Germany.

In 1950, he joined the physics group of the British Rubber Producers' Research Association. He became deputy director of the group in 1960 and its director in 1962. He retired in 1983.

During his tenure, MRPRA's control shifted to Malaysia from Great Britain. He expanded the association's research team and laboratories.

Awards and recognitions

 1966 - Colwyn medal in 1956 from the former Institution of the Rubber Industry
 1975 - honorary title Johan Mangku Negara for his work with natural rubber, bestowed by the king of Malaysia
 1976 - CMG
 1982 - Médaille de la ville de Paris
 1985 - Outstanding Service Award from PRI
 1986 - Charles Goodyear Medal from the ACS Rubber Division
 1988 - Carl Harries|Carl-Dietrich Harries Medal from the German rubber organization Dkt
 1988 - Eminent Citizen's Medal, Ho Chi Minh City

References 

Polymer scientists and engineers
1918 births
1997 deaths